Dorcus curvidens is a species of stag beetle.

References

Lucaninae
Beetles of Asia
Insects of Japan
Taxa named by Frederick William Hope
Beetles described in 1840